Precious metals are subject to taxation in most countries, because of their high economic value. In most countries capital gains tax applies when precious metals are sold at a profit. Some countries also apply value added tax to precious metals.

In the European Union, the trading of recognised gold coins and bullion products is VAT exempt, but no such allowance is given to silver. Elsewhere in Europe though, Norway has exempted both gold and silver bullion coins with face value from VAT; Norway is part of the wider EEA (European Economic Area) and thus applies the same "intra-community transaction" rules to all of Europe on a bilateral basis resulting in legally tax-free silver coin availability throughout all of Europe.

Canada, and 41 of the 50 United States, do not apply tax to bullion-quality silver and gold.

See also
 Gold as an investment
 Inflation hedge
 Palladium as an investment
 Platinum as an investment
 Silver as an investment

References

Investment
Tax